David Heymann may refer to:

David Heymann (architect), American architect
David L. Heymann (born 1946), American epidemiologist

See also
David Hayman (disambiguation)
David Heyman (disambiguation)